The Mers El Hadjadj Stadium is a multi-use stadium in Mers El Hadjadj in Oran District, Algeria. It is currently used mostly for football matches and it is holds 5,400 people. The stadium was used as one of the venues for the 2022 Mediterranean Games football tournament.

History
The start of construction of the stadium begins in 2020 as part of the organization of the city of Oran of the 2022 Mediterranean Games. The stadium is inaugurated in 2022 being one of the sites used for the football tournaments of these games Mediterranean, it had host three matches in the group stage.

References

External links
Stadium profile - besoccer.com

Football venues in Algeria
Sports venues in Oran
Multi-purpose stadiums in Algeria
Sports venues completed in 2022
2022 establishments in Algeria
21st-century architecture in Algeria